A synagogue, sometimes referred to by the Yiddish term shul and often used interchangeably with the word temple, is a Jewish house of worship. Synagogues have a place for prayer (the main sanctuary and sometimes smaller chapels), where Jews attend religious services or special ceremonies (including weddings, b'nai mitzvah, confirmations, choir performances, or even children's plays), have rooms for study, social hall(s), administrative and charitable offices, classrooms for religious school and Hebrew school, sometimes Jewish preschools, and often have many places to sit and congregate; display commemorative, historic, or modern artwork throughout; and sometimes have items of some Jewish historical significance or history about the Synagogue itself, on display.

Synagogues are consecrated spaces used for the purpose of Jewish prayer, study, assembly, and reading of the Torah (read in its entirety once a year, or in some synagogues on a triennial cycle, in weekly Torah portions during religious services). However, a Synagogue is not always necessary for Jewish worship, due to adaptations during times of Jewish persecution in countries and regions that banned Judaism, frequently destroying and/or reappropriating Synagogues into Churches or even government buildings. Halakha (Jewish "law," or Mitzvot, from the Mishnah -- the "Oral Torah") state that communal Jewish worship can be carried out wherever a minyan (a group of at least 10 Jewish adults) is assembled. Worship can also happen alone or with fewer than 10 people, but there are certain prayers that are considered by halakha as solely communal, and these can therefore be recited only by a minyan, depending on sect of Judaism. In terms of its specific ritual and liturgical functions, the Synagogue does not replace the symbol of the long-destroyed Temple in Jerusalem (1st or 2nd Temple).

Terminology
Israelis use the Hebrew term  "house of assembly". Ultra-Orthodox Hasidic Jews have traditionally used the Western Yiddish (German-Yiddish) term  (cognate with the German , 'school') in everyday speech. Sephardi Jews and Romaniote Jews generally use the term kal (from the Hebrew ḳahal, meaning "community"). Persian Jews and some Karaite Jews also use the term kenesa, which is derived from Aramaic, and some Mizrahi Jews use kenis or qnis. Most Reform and Conservative Jews use the word temple interchangeably with Synagogue, albeit only in North America, as this terminology is exceptionally rare in the United Kingdom and other English-speaking countries with significant Reform or Liberal populations. The Greek word synagogue is used in English to cover the preceding possibilities.

Origins 

Although synagogues existed a long time before the destruction of the Second Temple in 70 CE, communal worship in the time while the Temple still stood focused mostly on korbanot brought by the Kohanim (Aaronic priesthood line of Rabbinical succession) in the Temple in Jerusalem. The all-day Yom Kippur service, was an event in which the congregation both observed the movements of the kohen gadol ("high priest") as he presided over the day's traditions and processions, and administered prayers for success.

According to Jewish tradition, the men of the Great Assembly (around 5th century BCE) formalized and standardized the language of the Jewish prayers. Prior to that people prayed as they saw fit, with each individual praying in his or her own way, and there were no standard prayers that were recited.

Johanan ben Zakai, one of the leaders at the end of the Second Temple period, promulgated the idea of creating individual houses of worship in whatever locale Jews found themselves. This contributed to the continuity of the Jewish people by maintaining a unique identity and a portable way of worship despite the destruction of the Temple, according to many historians.

Purpose-built spaces for Jewish worship, or rooms originally constructed for some other purpose but reserved for formal, communal prayer, however, existed before the destruction of the Second Temple. The earliest archaeological evidence comes from Egypt, where stone proseuche dedication inscriptions dating from the 3rd century BCE prove that Jewish proseuches existed by that date. More than a dozen Jewish (and possibly Samaritan) Second Temple period synagogues have been identified by archaeologists in Israel, and in other countries belonging to the Hellenistic world. 

Any Jew or group of Jews can build a synagogue. Synagogues have been constructed by ancient Jewish leaders, by wealthy patrons, as part of a wide range of human institutions including secular educational institutions, governments, and hotels, by the entire Jewish community of living in a particular village or region, or by sub-groups of Jewish people arrayed according to occupation, ethnicity (i.e. the Sephardic, Yemenite, Polish or Persian Jews of a town), style of religious observance (i.e., Reform, Orthodox synagogue), or by the followers of a particular Rabbi (only in very small congregations or ultra-orthodox Hasidism).

It has been theorized that the synagogue became a place of worship in the region upon the destruction of the Second Temple during the First Jewish–Roman War; however, others speculate that there had been places of prayer, apart from the Temple, during the Hellenistic period. The popularization of prayer over sacrifice during the years prior to the destruction of the Second Temple in 70 CE had prepared the Jews for life in the diaspora, where prayer would serve as the focus of Jewish worship.

Despite the possibility of synagogue-like spaces prior to the First Jewish–Roman War, the synagogue emerged as a stronghold for Jewish worship upon the destruction of the Temple. For Jews living in the wake of the Revolt, the synagogue functioned as a "portable system of worship". Within the synagogue, Jews worshiped by way of prayer rather than sacrifices, which had previously served as the main form of worship within the Second Temple.

Second Temple period 
In 1995, Howard Clark Kee argued that synagogues were not a developed feature of Jewish life prior to the First Jewish-Roman War (66-73 CE). Kee interpreted his findings as evidence that the mentions of synagogues in the New Testament, including Jesus's visitations of synagogues in various Jewish settlements in Israel, were anachronistic. However, by 2018, Mordechai Aviam reported that there were now at least nine synagogues excavated known to pre-date the destruction of the Jerusalem Temple in 70 CE, including in Magdala, Gamla, Masada, Herodium, Modi‘in (Kh. Umm el-‘Umdan), Qiryat Sepher (Kh. Bad ‘Issa), and Kh. Diab. Aviam concluded that he thought almost every Jewish settlement at the time, whether it was a polis or a village, had a synagogue.

 Gamla - a synagogue was discovered near the city gate at Gamla, a site in the Golan northeast of the Sea of Galilee. This city was destroyed by the Roman army in 67 CE and was never rebuilt.
 Masada - a synagogue was discovered on the western side of Masada, just south of the palace complex at the northern end of the site. One of the unique finds at this synagogue was a group of 14 scrolls, which included biblical, sectarian, and apocryphal documents.
 Herodium - a synagogue from the 1st century was discovered in Herod's palace fortress at Herodium.
 Magdala - also known as the Migdal Synagogue, this synagogue was discovered in 2009. One of the unique features of this synagogue, which is located on the western shore of the Sea of Galilee, is an intricately carved stone block that was found in the center of the main room.
 Modi'in - Discovered between Modi'in and Latrun is the oldest synagogue within modern Israel that has been found to date, built during the second century BCE. It includes three rooms and a nearby mikve.

Middle Ages
Rabbi and philosopher, Maimonides (1138–1204), described the various customs in his day with respect to local synagogues:
Synagogues and houses of study must be treated with respect. They are swept and sprinkled [with water] to lay the dust. In Spain and the Maghreb, in Babylonia and in the Holy Land, it is customary to kindle lamps in the synagogues and to spread mats on the floor upon which the worshippers sit. In the lands of Edom (Christendom), they sit in synagogues upon chairs [or benches].

Samaritan synagogues

Name and history 
The Samaritan house of worship is also called a synagogue. During the 3rd and 2nd centuries BCE, during the Hellenistic period, the Greek word used in the Diaspora by Samaritans and Jews was the same: proseucheμ (literally, a place of prayer); a later, 3rd or 4th century CE inscription, uses a similar Greek term: eukteμrion (prayer house). The oldest Samaritan synagogue discovered so far is from Delos in the Aegean Islands, with an inscription dated between 250 and 175 BCE, while most Samaritan synagogues excavated in the wider Land of Israel and ancient Samaria in particular, were built during the 4th-7th centuries, at the very end of the Roman and throughout the Byzantine period.

Distinguishing elements
The elements which distinguish Samaritan synagogues from contemporary Jewish ones are:
 Alphabet: the use of the Samaritan script
 Orthography. When the Samaritan script is used, there are some Hebrew words which would be spelled in a way typical only for the Samaritan Pentateuch, for instance "forever" is written 'lmw instead of l'lm. When Greek is the language used in inscriptions, typically, Samaritans may contract two Hebrew words into one, such har (mountain) and Gerizim becoming, in Greek, Argarizein.
 Orientation: the façade, or entrance of the Samaritan synagogue, is typically facing towards Mount Gerizim, which is the most holy site to Samaritans, while Jewish synagogues would be oriented towards Jerusalem and the Temple Mount.
 Decoration: the mosaic floor and other architectural elements or artifacts are sometimes decorated with typical symbols. As the Samaritans have historically adhered more strictly to the commandment forbidding the creation of any "graven image", they would not use any depictions of man or beast. Representations of the signs of the zodiac, of human figures or even Greek deities such as the god Helios, as seen in Byzantine-period Jewish synagogues, would be unimaginable in Samaritan buildings of any period.

A representation of Mount Gerizim is a clear indication of Samaritan identity. On the other hand, although the existence of a Samaritan temple on Mount Gerizim is both mentioned by Josephus and confirmed by archaeological excavation at its summit, the temple's early destruction in the 2nd century BCE led to its memory disappearing from Samaritan tradition, so that no temple-related items would be found in Samaritan synagogue depictions. Religious implements, such as are also known from ancient Jewish synagogue mosaics (menorah, shofar, shewbread table, trumpets, incense shovels, and specifically the façade of what looks like a temple or a Torah shrine) are also present in Samaritan ones, but the objects are always related to the desert Tabernacle, the Ark of the Covenant within the Tabernacle, or the Torah shrine in the synagogue itself. Samaritans believe that at the end of time the Tabernacle and its utensils will be recovered from the place they were buried on Mount Gerizim and as such play an important role in Samaritan beliefs. Since the same artists, such as mosaicists, worked for all ethno-religious communities of the time, some depictions might be identical in Samaritan and Jewish synagogues, Christian churches and pagan temples, but their significance would differ.

Missing from Samaritan synagogue floors would be images often found in Jewish ones: the lulav (palm-branch) and etrog (lemon-like fruit) have a different ritual use by Samaritans celebrating Sukkot, and do not appear on mosaic floors.

 Ritual baths near the synagogue after 70 CE: Jews abandoned the habit of building mikva'ot next to their houses of worship after the 70 CE destruction of the Jerusalem Temple, but Samaritans continued with the practice.

Archaeological finds
Ancient Samaritan synagogues are mentioned by literary sources or have been found by archaeologists in the Diaspora, in the wider Holy Land, and specifically in Samaria.

Diaspora
 Delos Synagogue: a Samaritan inscription has been dated to between 250 and 175 BCE.
 Rome and Tarsus: ancient literature offers hints that Samaritan synagogues may have existed in these cities between the fourth and sixth centuries CE.
 Thessaloniki and Syracuse: short inscriptions found there and using the Samaritan and Greek alphabet may originate from Samaritan synagogues.

The wider Holy Land
 Sha'alvim synagogue, discovered in Judea, northwest of Jerusalem. Probably built in the 4th or 5th century CE and destroyed in the 5th or 6th.
 Tell Qasile synagogue, built at the beginning of the 7th century CE
 Beth Shean, "Synagogue A". A room added to an existing building in the late 6th or early 7th century CE served as a Samaritan synagogue.

Samaria
 El-Khirbe synagogue, discovered c. 3 km from Sebaste, was built in the 4th century CE and remained in use into the Early Islamic period, with a break during the late 5th–early 6th century
 Khirbet Samara synagogue, c. 20 km northwest of Nablus and built in the 4th century CE
 Zur Natan synagogue, c. 29 km west of Nablus and built in the 5th century CE

Christianity
In the New Testament, the word appears 56 times, mostly in the Synoptic Gospels, but also in the Gospel of John and the Book of Revelation. It is used in the sense of 'assembly' in the Epistle of James. Alternatively, the epistle of James (in Greek, clearly Ἰάκωβος or יעקב, anglicized to Jacob) refers to a place of assembly that was indeed Jewish, with Jacob ben Joseph perhaps an elder there. The specific word in James (Jacob) 2:2 could easily be rendered "synagogue," from the Greek συναγωγὴν.

During the first Christian centuries, Jewish Christian are hypothesized to have used houses of worship known in academic literature as synagogue-churches. Scholars have claimed to have identified such houses of worship of the Jews who had accepted Jesus as the Messiah in Jerusalem and Nazareth.

Architectural design

There is no set blueprint for synagogues and the architectural shapes and interior designs of synagogues vary greatly. In fact, the influence from other local religious buildings can often be seen in synagogue arches, domes and towers.

Historically, synagogues were built in the prevailing architectural style of their time and place. Thus, the synagogue in Kaifeng, China looked very like Chinese temples of that region and era, with its outer wall and open garden in which several buildings were arranged. The styles of the earliest synagogues resembled the temples of other cults of the Eastern Roman Empire. The surviving synagogues of medieval Spain are embellished with mudéjar plasterwork. The surviving medieval synagogues in Budapest and Prague are typical Gothic structures.

With the emancipation of Jews in Western European countries, which not only enabled Jews to enter fields of enterprise from which they were formerly barred, but gave them the right to build synagogues without needing special permissions, synagogue architecture blossomed. Large Jewish communities wished to show not only their wealth but also their newly acquired status as citizens by constructing magnificent synagogues. These were built across Western Europe and in the United States in all of the historicist or revival styles then in fashion. Thus there were Neoclassical, Neo-Byzantine, Romanesque Revival, Moorish Revival, Gothic Revival, and Greek Revival. There are Egyptian Revival synagogues and even one Mayan Revival synagogue. In the 19th century and early 20th century heyday of historicist architecture, however, most historicist synagogues, even the most magnificent ones, did not attempt a pure style, or even any particular style, and are best described as eclectic.

In the post-war era, synagogue architecture abandoned historicist styles for modernism.

Interior elements

Bimah (platform)
All synagogues contain a Bimah, a large, raised, reader's platform (called  (reading dais) by Sephardim), where the Torah scroll is placed to be read. In Sephardi synagogues it is also used as the prayer leader's reading desk. This is also so in the Ashkenazi United Synagogue in England, UK, who adopted some of the Sephardi customs.

Table or lectern
In Ashkenazi synagogues, the Torah was read on a reader's table located in the center of the room, while the leader of the prayer service, the hazzan, stood at his own lectern or table, facing the Ark. In Sephardic synagogues, the table for reading the Torah (reading dais) was commonly placed at the opposite side of the room from the Torah Ark, leaving the center of the floor empty for the use of a ceremonial procession carrying the Torah between the Ark and the reading table. Most contemporary synagogues feature a lectern for the rabbi.

Torah Ark

The Torah Ark, called in Hebrew  Aron Kodesh or 'holy chest', and alternatively called the heikhal— or 'temple' by Sephardic Jews, is a cabinet in which the Torah scrolls are kept.

The ark in a synagogue is almost always positioned in such a way such that those who face it are facing towards Jerusalem. Thus, sanctuary seating plans in the Western world generally face east, while those east of Israel face west. Sanctuaries in Israel face towards Jerusalem. Occasionally synagogues face other directions for structural reasons; in such cases, some individuals might turn to face Jerusalem when standing for prayers, but the congregation as a whole does not.

The Ark is reminiscent of the Ark of the Covenant, which held the tablets inscribed with the Ten Commandments. This is the holiest spot in a synagogue, equivalent to the Holy of Holies.

Eternal Light

Inner decoration

A synagogue may be decorated with artwork, but in the Rabbinic and Orthodox tradition, three-dimensional sculptures and depictions of the human body are not allowed as these are considered akin to idolatry.

Seating
Originally, synagogues were made devoid of much furniture, the Jewish congregants in Spain, the Maghreb (North Africa), Babylonia, the Land of Israel and Yemen having a custom to sit upon the floor, which had been strewn with mats and cushions, rather than upon chairs or benches. In other European towns and cities, however, Jewish congregants would sit upon chairs and benches. Today, the custom has spread in all places to sit upon chairs and benches.

Until the 19th century, in an Ashkenazi synagogue, all seats most often faced the Torah Ark. In a Sephardic synagogue, seats were usually arranged around the perimeter of the sanctuary, but when the worshipers stood up to pray, everyone faced the Ark.

Special seats
Many current synagogues have an elaborate chair named for the prophet Elijah, which is only sat upon during the ceremony of Brit milah.

In ancient synagogues, a special chair placed on the wall facing Jerusalem and next to the Torah Shrine was reserved for the prominent members of the congregation and for important guests. Such a stone-carved and inscribed seat was discovered at archaeological excavations in the synagogue at Chorazin in Galilee and dates from the 4th–6th century; another one was discovered at the Delos Synagogue, complete with a footstool.

Rules for attendees

Removing one's shoes
In Yemen, the Jewish custom was to remove one's shoes immediately prior to entering the synagogue, a custom that had been observed by Jews in other places in earlier times. The same practice of removing one's shoes before entering the synagogue was also largely observed among Jews in Morocco in the early 20th-century. On the island of Djerba in Tunisia, Jews still remove their shoes when entering a synagogue. The custom of removing one's shoes is no longer practiced in Israel, the United Kingdom, or the United States. However, in Karaite Judaism, the custom of removing one's shoes prior to entering a synagogue is still observed worldwide.

Gender separation

In Orthodox synagogues, men and women do not sit together. The synagogue features a partition dividing the men's and women's seating areas, or a separate women's section located on a balcony.

Denominational differences

Reform Judaism

The German–Jewish Reform movement, which arose in the early 19th century, made many changes to the traditional look of the synagogue, keeping with its desire to simultaneously stay Jewish yet be accepted by the surrounding culture.

The first Reform synagogue, which opened in Hamburg in 1811, introduced changes that made the synagogue look more like a church. These included: the installation of an organ to accompany the prayers (even on Shabbat, when musical instruments are proscribed by halakha), a choir to accompany the hazzan, and vestments for the synagogue rabbi to wear.

In following decades, the central reader's table, the Bimah, was moved to the front of the Reform sanctuary—previously unheard-of in Orthodox synagogues.

Gender separation was also removed.

Synagogue as community center
Synagogues often take on a broader role in modern Jewish communities and may include additional facilities such as a catering hall, kosher kitchen, religious school, library, day care center and a smaller chapel for daily services.

Synagogue offshoots
Since many Orthodox and some non-Orthodox Jews prefer to collect a minyan (a quorum of ten) rather than pray alone, they commonly assemble at pre-arranged times in offices, living rooms, or other spaces when these are more convenient than formal synagogue buildings. A room or building that is used this way can become a dedicated small synagogue or prayer room.

Another type of communal prayer group, favored by some contemporary Jews, is the chavurah (pl. chavurot), or prayer fellowship. These groups meet at a regular place and time, either in a private home or in a synagogue or other institutional space. In antiquity, the Pharisees lived near each other in chavurot and dined together to ensure that none of the food was unfit for consumption.

List of "great synagogues"
Some synagogues bear the title "great synagogue".

Israel

 The Belz Great Synagogue, Jerusalem
 The Great Synagogue of Jerusalem

Europe

Russia, Ukraine and Belarus

 The Moscow Choral Synagogue
 The Grand Choral Synagogue of St. Petersburg
 The Kharkiv Choral Synagogue
 The Great Choral Synagogue (Kyiv), Ukraine

Poland
 The Great Synagogues of Warsaw and Łódź, destroyed by Nazis during World War II.
 The Great Synagogue of Włodawa

Czech Republic
 The Great Synagogue of Plzeň

Hungary

 The Dohány Street Synagogue in Budapest, Hungary
 The Synagogue of Szeged

Austria
 The Leopoldstädter Tempel of Vienna, destroyed during the "Kristallnacht" pogrom. Served as model for many other important synagogues.

Germany
 The New Synagogue of Berlin

Netherlands
 The Portuguese Synagogue of Amsterdam

Scandinavia
 The Great Synagogue of Stockholm

France and Belgium
 The Grand Synagogue of Paris
 The Great Synagogue of Brussels (also known as the Great Synagogue of Europe)

Italy

 The Great Synagogue of Florence
 The Great Synagogue of Rome
 The Synagogue of Trieste

Romania
 The Cetate Synagogue of Timișoara, 
 The Fabric Synagogue of Timișoara, Romania
 The Choral Temple of Bucharest

Serbia

 The Synagogue of Novi Sad
 The Synagogue of Subotica

Bosnia and Herzegovina 

 The Synagogue of Sarajevo
 The Synagogue of Doboj

Bulgaria 

 The Synagogue of Sofia

Turkey (European part)
 The Grand Synagogue of Edirne

United Kingdom 
 The Great Synagogue of London, destroyed by aerial bombing in the London Blitz in 1941

Tunisia
 The Great Synagogue of Tunis
 The El Ghriba synagogue of Djerba

Australia
 The Great Synagogue of Sydney

World's largest synagogues

Israel
Construction on the edifice took more than 25 years.
 Kehilat Kol HaNeshama, a Reform synagogue located in Baka, Jerusalem, is the largest Reform (and largest non-Orthodox) Jewish synagogue in Israel.

Europe
 The Dohány Street Synagogue in Budapest, Hungary, is the largest synagogue in Europe by square footage and number of seats.
 The Synagogue of Trieste is the largest synagogue in Western Europe.
 The Great Synagogue of Rome is one of the greatest in Europe.
 The Portuguese Synagogue in Amsterdam, also called "Esnoga", was built in 1675. At that time it was the largest synagogue in the world. It was built to accommodate 1227 men and 440 women.
 The Sofia Synagogue is located in Sofia, Bulgaria, seating about 1,200.
 The Subotica Synagogue is located in Subotica, Serbia, seating more than 900.
 Great Synagogue (Plzeň) in the Czech Republic is the second-largest synagogue in Europe, and the third-largest in the world.

North America
 Baron Hirsch Synagogue, an Orthodox synagogue in Memphis, Tennessee, was the largest in the United States at the time of its dedication in 1957, seating 2,200 worshippers with an additional accommodation for 1,000 in its main sanctuary. The synagogue moved in 1988, but the building remains in use as a church.
 The Satmar synagogue in Kiryas Joel, New York, which is said to seat "several thousand", is also very large.
 Congregation Yetev Lev D'Satmar (Rodney Street, Brooklyn) is also said to seat "several thousand".
It is the largest Reform synagogue in the world.
 Congregation Yetev Lev D'Satmar (Hooper Street, Brooklyn) seats between 2,000 and 4,000 congregants.
 The main sanctuary of Adas Israel Congregation (Washington, D.C.) seats 1,500.
 Temple Emanu-El (Miami Beach, Florida) located in Miami Beach, Florida, seats approximately 1,400 people.
 Congregation Shaare Zion, an Orthodox Sephardic synagogue located in Brooklyn, New York, is the largest Syrian Jewish congregation in New York City. It is attended by over 1,000 worshipers on weekends.
 Beth Tzedec Congregation in Toronto, Ontario, is the largest Conservative synagogue in North America.
 Temple Israel, a Reform synagogue in Memphis, Tennessee seats 1,335 to 1,500 people in its main sanctuary.

World's oldest synagogues

 The oldest synagogue fragments are stone-carved synagogue dedication inscriptions found in Middle and Lower Egypt and dating from the 3rd century BCE.
 The oldest Samaritan synagogue, the Delos Synagogue, dates from between 150 and 128 BCE, or earlier and is located on the island of Delos.
 The synagogue of Dura Europos, a Seleucid city in north eastern Syria, dates from the third century CE. It is unique. The walls were painted with figural scenes from the Old Testament. The paintings included Abraham and Isaac, Moses and Aaron, Solomon, Samuel and Jacob, Elijah and Ezekiel. The synagogue chamber, with its surviving paintings, is reconstructed in the National Museum in Damascus.
 The Old Synagogue in Erfurt, Germany, parts of which date to c.1100, is the oldest intact synagogue building in Europe. It is now used as a museum of local Jewish history.
The Kochangadi Synagogue (1344 A.D. to 1789 A.D.) in Kochi in the Kerala, built by the Malabar Jews. It was destroyed by Tipu Sultan in 1789 A.D. and was never rebuilt. An inscription tablet from this synagogue is the oldest relic from any synagogue in India. Eight other synagogues exist in Kerala though not in active use anymore.

 The Paradesi Synagogue is the oldest active synagogue in the Commonwealth of Nations, located in Kochi, Kerala, in India. It was built in 1568 by Paradesi community in the Kingdom of Cochin. Paradesi is a word used in several Indian languages, and the literal meaning of the term is "foreigners", applied to the synagogue because it was historically used by "White Jews", a mixture of Jews of the Middle East, and European exiles. It is also referred to as the Cochin Jewish Synagogue or the Mattancherry Synagogue. The synagogue is located in the quarter of Old Cochin known as Jew Town and is the only one of the eight synagogues in the area still in use.
 Jew's Court, Steep Hill, Lincoln, England, is arguably the oldest synagogue in Europe in current use.

Oldest synagogues in the United States

 Congregation Shearith Israel, in New York City, founded in 1654, is the oldest congregation in the United States. Its present building dates from 1897.
 The Touro Synagogue in Newport, Rhode Island, is the oldest Jewish house of worship in North America that is still standing. It was built in 1759 for the Jeshuat Israel congregation, which was established in 1658.

Other famous synagogues
 The Worms Synagogue in Germany, built in 1175 and razed on Kristallnacht in 1938, was painstakingly reconstructed using many of the original stones. It is still in use as a synagogue.
 The Synagogue of El Transito of Toledo, Spain, was built in 1356 by Samuel ha-Levi, treasurer of King Pedro I of Castile. This is one of the best examples of Mudéjar architecture in Spain. The design of the synagogue recalls the Nasrid style of architecture that was employed during the same period in the decorations of the palace of the Alhambra in Granada as well as the Mosque of Córdoba. Since 1964, this site has hosted a Sephardi museum.
 The Hurva Synagogue, located in the Jewish Quarter of the Old City of Jerusalem, was Jerusalem's main Ashkenazi synagogue from the 16th century until 1948, when it was destroyed by the Arab Legion several days after the conquest of the city. After the Six-Day War, an arch was built to mark the spot where the synagogue stood. A complete reconstruction, to plans drawn up by architect Nahum Meltzer, opened in March 2010.
 The Abdallah Ibn Salam Mosque or Oran, Algeria, built in 1880, but converted into a mosque in 1975 when most Algerian Jews had left the country for France following independence.
The Nidhe Israel Synagogue ("Bridgetown Synagogue") of Barbados, located in the capital city of Bridgetown, was first built in 1654. It was destroyed in the hurricane of 1831 and reconstructed in 1833.
 The Curaçao synagogue or Snoa in Willemstad, Curaçao, Netherlands Antilles was built by Sephardic Portuguese Jews from Amsterdam and Recife, Brazil. It is modeled after the Esnoga in Amsterdam. Congregation Mikvé Israel built this synagogue in 1692; it was reconstructed in 1732.
 The Bialystoker Synagogue on New York's Lower East Side, is located in a landmark building dating from 1826 that was originally a Methodist Episcopal Church. The building is made of quarry stone mined locally on Pitt Street, Manhattan. It is an example of federal architecture. The ceilings and walls are hand-painted with zodiac frescos, and the sanctuary is illuminated by  stained glass windows. The bimah and floor-to-ceiling ark are handcarved.
 The Great Synagogue of Florence, Tempio Maggiore, Florence, 1874–82, is an example of the magnificent, cathedral-like synagogues built in almost every major European city in the 19th century and early 20th century.
 Boston's 1920 Vilna Shul is a rare surviving intact Immigrant Era synagogue.
 The Congregation Or Hatzafon "Light of the North", Fairbanks, Alaska, is the world's northernmost synagogue building.
 The Görlitz Synagogue in Görlitz, Germany was built in Jugendstil style between 1909 and 1911. Damaged, but not destroyed, during the Kristallnacht riots, the synagogue was bought by the City Council in 1963. After extensive renovations concluding in late 2020, the main sanctuary (Kuppelsaal with 310 seats) will be reopened for general culture, and the small synagogue (Wochentags-Synagoge, with space for around 45 visitors)

Gallery

See also
Great Synagogue (disambiguation)
List of synagogues
List of synagogues in the United States
Mandi (Mandaeism)
Place of worship
Prayer book
Rabbi
Siddur
Zionist churches
Synagogue Church
Temple

Notes

References

 
 Messinas, Elias (2022). The Synagogues of Greece: A Study of Synagogues in Macedonia and Thrace: With Architectural Drawings of all Synagogues of Greece. Seattle: KDP. .
 Young, Penny (2014). Dura Europos: A City for Everyman. Diss, Norfolk, UK: Twopenny Press. .

External links

 Jewish Encyclopedia: Synagogue
 Chabad Lubavitch Center & Synagogue Finder
 Orthodox Union Synagogue Finder
 United Synagogue of Conservative Judaism Synagogue Finder
 Union for Reform Judaism Synagogue Finder
 Reconstructionist Synagogue Finder

 
Jewish holy places
Jewish buildings
Building types